Heart to Heart is a 2015 South Korean television series starring Choi Kang-hee and Chun Jung-myung. It is directed by Lee Yoon-jung, and written by Lee Jung-ah, the writer-director duo of the famous The 1st Shop of Coffee Prince. It aired on tvN from January 9 to March 7, 2015 on Fridays at 20:30 for 16 episodes.

Plot
Go Yi-seok (Chun Jung-myung) is a successful psychiatrist with a best-selling book and talk show appearances under his belt. Though loving, sensitive and caring towards his family, he is also insecure, egocentric and suffers from an inferiority complex, caused by his childhood experiences. The resulting juvenile behaviour renders him incapable of forming meaningful relationships with women. To make matters worse, he's gradually developing a phobia of his patients, being unable to empathise with their whining - which drives him to drink while on duty.

Cha Hong-do (Choi Kang-hee) is a bright, confident and opinionated woman, whose uncontrollable blushing has left her with crippling sociophobia and caused her to drop out from high-school. She ventures outside her home only when shielded by a helmet and works under disguise as an old grandmother. She nurses a crush of seven years on the kind detective Jang Doo-soo (Lee Jae-yoon) and expresses her feelings by secretly delivering food to his doorstep with notes.

A chance hearing of Doo-soo's blind-date arrangements and upon reading Yi-seok's book, Hong-do is spurred and encouraged to approach Yi-seok's clinic for treatment, so that she can speak to Doo-soo freely face-to-face. A disastrous first encounter leads to Hong-do mistakenly accusing Yi-seok of murder and ends with Yi-seok discovering his phobia disappears when Hong-do is around, while she uncovers his vulnerable side hidden underneath the swagger.

Mutual dependency forces the two to work together, and both slowly realise how beneficial their companionship is to each other. His skill as a psychiatrist allows her real self to blossom into the open, while her inner strength and steadfastness helps him overcome his hidden insecurities.

Entanglements arise when Doo-soo belatedly realises his own feelings for Hong-do and begins to pursue her actively, throwing a spanner into the budding relationship. To complicate things further, Yi-seok's sister Go Se-ro (Ahn So-hee) falls for Doo-soo. Things come to a head for the couple when the Go family's dark past begins to unravel and threatens to drive a nail into the coffin of their bond.

Cast
Choi Kang-hee as Cha Hong-do/Oh Young-rae
Heo Jung-eun as young Hong-do
Chun Jung-myung as Go Yi-seok
Nam Da-reum as young Yi-seok
Lee Jae-yoon as Jang Doo-soo
Ahn So-hee as Go Se-ro, Yi-seok's sister
Joo Hyun as Go Sang-gyu, Yi-seok's grandfather
Kim Ki-bang as Detective Yang
Um Hyo-sup as Go Jae-woong, Yi-seok's father
Jin Hee-kyung as Hwang Moon-sun, Yi-seok's mother
Park Hee-jin as Talk show host
Choi Su-rin as Doctor Uhm's friend	
Hwang Seung-eon as Woo Yeon-woo, Yi-seok's girlfriend
Seo Yi-sook as Psychiatrist Uhm Ki-choon
Choi Moo-sung as Butler Ahn Byung-yeol
Kim Ae-kyung as Housekeeper Hwang Geum-shim 
Lee Moon-jung as Curator (cameo)
Lee Bit-na as teenage Cha Hong-do (cameo Ep.1)
Choi Daniel as Bakery owner (cameo appearance)
Ryu Hye-young as Lee Eun-ho/Lee Jin-ho

Ratings
In this table,  represent the lowest ratings and  represent the highest ratings.

Notes

References

External links
 
Heart to Heart at Studio Dragon 
Heart to Heart at Chorokbaem Media 
Heart to Heart at Mega Monster 

2015 South Korean television series debuts
2015 South Korean television series endings
TVN (South Korean TV channel) television dramas
South Korean romantic comedy television series
South Korean medical television series
Television series by Chorokbaem Media
Television series by Mega Monster